The Brown–Koerner House is a historic farm property at 38340 Winsome Trail Lane, in rural Loudoun County, Virginia northeast of Purcellville.  The centerpiece of the property is a two-story stone farmhouse built about 1815, along with a period springhouse and retaining wall.  It is a fine example of period domestic architecture, and remains relatively isolated despite of the loss to development of surrounding land that once formed part of the property.

The property was listed on the National Register of Historic Places in 2016.

Birthplace of Susan Catherine Wright
Susan Catherine Koerner Wright, the mother of aviation pioneers Wilbur and Orville Wright, was born in the Brown–Koerner House on April 30, 1831, to Catherine and John Koerner. Shortly after her birth, the family moved from Virginia to Indiana.

See also
National Register of Historic Places listings in Loudoun County, Virginia

References

Houses on the National Register of Historic Places in Virginia
Federal architecture in Virginia
Greek Revival houses in Virginia
Houses completed in 1785
Houses in Loudoun County, Virginia
National Register of Historic Places in Loudoun County, Virginia
Historic districts in Loudoun County, Virginia